That Night (1987) is the second novel by American author Alice McDermott, published in 1987 by Farrar, Straus and Giroux. The novel was a Finalist for both the Pulitzer Prize in 1988 and the National Book Award in 1987.

Set in the 1960s, the novel's narrated through the lens of a 10-year-old girl fascinated with the romantic lives of two Long Island teenagers, Sheryl and Rick. In 1992, the novel was adapted into a film of the same name by director Craig Bolotin, starring C. Thomas Howell and Juliette Lewis.

References

1987 novels
Farrar & Rinehart books
Novels set in Long Island
Fiction set in the 1960s
PEN/Faulkner Award for Fiction-winning works